Insomnium is a melodic death metal band from Joensuu, Finland. The sound and lyrical themes of their music portray darkness, sorrow, loss, pain, and nature. They are primarily a melodic death metal band with occasional elements of doom metal and progressive metal.

History 
On 9 September 2011 Insomnium released the music video "Through the Shadows" from their 2011 album, One for Sorrow.

In November, 2011 Insomnium embarked on their first headlining European tour with support from Before the Dawn and MyGRAIN. During April, 2012 Insomnium returned to tour the U.K. as the main support act for British gothic metal band, Paradise Lost. Vreid was also present on the tour as a supporting opening act.

On 19 September 2013 Insomnium released "Ephemeral," a single from their foreshadowed 2014 album, Shadows of the Dying Sun, via Century Media Records. It is the first track to feature new guitarist, Markus Vanhala (Omnium Gatherum), who replaced Ville Vänni in 2011.

On 29 April 2014 Insomnium released their sixth studio album, Shadows of the Dying Sun. On 30 April 2014 they made a guest appearance on Epica's CD release show at 013 in the Netherlands.

On 19 May 2016, Insomnium announced their seventh studio album, Winter's Gate to be released on 23 September. It is a concept album consisting of a single epic 40-minute track, and it is said to be about "a group of Vikings who set out to find a fabled island west of Ireland, despite the treacherous winter drawing near." This album was based on the short story by Niilo, "Winter's Gate", or "Talven Portti" in the original Finnish. This story won or was nominated for many Finnish awards.

In 2019, they announced their eighth album, Heart Like a Grave, would be released on 4 October 2019. With the album announcement they also confirmed that the guitarist Jani Liimatainen had joined the band as a full-time member, as he had occasionally filled in for Ville Friman on tours since 2015.

Insomnium released a new EP, titled Argent Moon, on September 17, 2021. Simultaneously, they talked about plans for an upcoming ninth studio album to be released in 2022. In 2022, they announced their ninth album, Anno 1696, would be released on 24 February 2023. Like Winter's Gate, the album is based on a short story by Niilo.

Members

Current members 
 Niilo Sevänen − bass, harsh vocals (1997−present)
Ville Friman − guitars (1997−present), clean vocals (2011−present)
 Markus Hirvonen − drums (1997−present)
 Markus Vanhala − guitars (2011−present)
 Jani Liimatainen − guitars, clean vocals (2019−present, touring 2015−2019)

Former members 
 Tapani Pesonen − drums, guitars (1997−1998)
 Timo Partanen − guitars (1998−2001)
 Ville Vänni − guitars (2001−2011)

Touring members 
 Nick Cordle − guitars (2022)
 Mike Bear - vocals,bass (2015)

Timeline

Discography

Studio albums

Singles

Demos 
 Demo 1999 (1999)
 Underneath the Moonlit Waves (2000)

EPs 
Ephemeral (2013)
 Argent Moon (2021)

References

External links

 

 
1997 establishments in Finland
Finnish heavy metal musical groups
Finnish melodic death metal musical groups
Musical groups established in 1997
Musical quintets
Candlelight Records artists